McTernan is a surname. Notable people with the surname include:

John McTernan (actor), Australian actor
John McTernan (born 1959), English politician and political consultant
Sarah McTernan (born 1994), Irish singer-songwriter

See also
 McKiernan Clan
 McKernan (surname)
 McKiernan
 McTiernan
 Tiernan
 Kiernan
 Kernan (disambiguation)